K. elegans may refer to:
 Kerriodoxa elegans, a palm species
 Klebsormidium elegans, a filamentous charophyte alga species
 Koelreuteria elegans, the Chinese rain tree, a deciduous tree species native to Taiwan and southern China

Synonyms
 Kickxia elegans, a synonym for Nanorrhinum elegans, a cancerwort flower species found in Cape Verde